Martial Masters ( Xíngyìqúan; Japanese name: シンイーケン, Shin-Ī Ken) is an arcade fighting game developed by IGS and released in 1999. Andamiro later released the game in the US in 2001. The setting and characters draw inspiration from Hong Kong martial arts films, specifically Once Upon a Time in China, Drunken Master and Operation Scorpio. The game is highly reminiscent of Capcom's fighting games of the mid to late 1990s for its impressive 2D visual and fluid animation with mechanics very similar to those of Street Fighter III. Martial Masters is IGS's third arcade 2D fighting game, with Alien Challenge being their first, The Killing Blade their second, and Spectral vs. Generation being their fourth (in collaboration with Idea Factory).

Gameplay
The game features 12 fighters, each with their own special moves and fighting styles. Moves include throws, air attacks, ground attacks, taunts, teleport, recovery, martial arts moves, special moves, and super special moves.

Like most of the newer fighting games that have been created, Martial Masters has a combo counter, has Pressure Moves which are performed by pressing the control stick in a certain direction with a button, Roll Recovery that will let you recovery from an attack that knocks your character down before you hit the ground, Flash Attack that will knock your opponent away from when they are attacking you, Shadow Attacks which there are 2 variations of, 1st being a juggle type attack that will knock your opponent up into the air, 2nd is a ground attack that can usually do anywhere between 4 and 13 hits.

Story
At the end of the Qing dynasty, the government weakened by corruption was attacked by foreign influences. The people were flung into misery and became quite unsatisfied with the situation. They did not believe in the government anymore and turned their faith back to religion.

The White Lotus Sect saw this as an opportunity and took over. They claimed to help the government to defeat foreigners and bring peace to the world. Their Ideology was quickly adopted. Everything related with the Western world was killed or destroyed. Anyone against this principle was considered an enemy and accused of being bound with the devil. Dragon of Martial Master and Master Huang of Po Chi Lam could not accept these outrageous actions so they band together in order to prevent much bloodshed.

One day the leader of White Lotus Sect sent an invitation to Dragon and Master Huang but Dragon's disciples saw this as a trap and recommended that they wait for Master Huang, who was out of town collecting medicine.  The Master did not want to miss this opportunity to make peace and went alone. Unfortunately, he was captured and put in prison.  Both parties started confrontations and have struggled since then.

Now dangers are hidden all over the place.  Who is capable of resolving the situation?  Let's find out!

Characters
Master Huang - The righteous young heir to the Hongjiaquan style.
Crane - A practitioner of the crane style (Hè Quán).
Monk - A large muscular Shaolin monk.
Drunk Master - A master of drunken boxing (Zuì Quán) based on Beggar Su from the Drunken Master film.
Red Snake - A practitioner of the snake style (Shé Quán) and Scorpion's fiancée.
Ghost Kick - Based on the character Club Foot from Once Upon a Time in China III. He is a rickshaw puller who fights only with his legs.
Scorpion - Based on the villain Sunny from Operation Scorpio, he practices the scorpion style. A womanizer, he is unwillingly engaged to Red Snake.
Monkey Boy - A 21-year-old man who practices the monkey style (Hóu Quán), he also has some monkeys as his "disciples".
Reika - A girl whose town was destroyed by the White Lotus Sect in a failed attempt to kidnap her. She fights to find out the reason of her kidnapping.
Tiger - Possibly based on Tiger from Once Upon a Time in China, but unlike his namesake in the film, he protects missionaries from the White Lotus group. Practices the tiger style (Hǔ Quán).
Saojin - Huang Fei-hung's father's sworn sister and his sworn aunt, she is based on Thirteenth Aunt from the Once Upon a Time in China series. She is a secret playable character and sub-boss for Red Snake. Her style is unknown, she is the only character who have helpers who are Leung Foon, Lam Sai Wing and Bucket So (all Master Huang's disciples who also appear in his stage, however they are no longer there if Saojin is present).
Lotus Master - A mysterious man who poses as the leader of White Lotus Sect who wishes to take over the sect, he is based on Priest Kung from Once Upon a Time in China II. His style is unknown, however is labeled as "secret skills of White Lotus Cult".
True Lotus Master - The true leader of White Lotus Sect, he can be considered an overpowered version of Lotus Master. Also a secret playable character, but he has no endings of his own.

External links 
 Martial Masters Official site (Taiwanese; Archived)

1999 video games
Arcade video games
Arcade-only video games
Fighting games
International Games System games
PolyGame Master games
Video games developed in Taiwan
Wuxia video games